Edward F. Flanagan (September 15, 1861 – November 10, 1926), was an American professional baseball player who played first base in the Major Leagues during the 1887 and 1889 seasons. He played in the minor leagues through 1899.

External links

1861 births
1926 deaths
Major League Baseball first basemen
Baseball players from Massachusetts
19th-century baseball players
Philadelphia Athletics (AA) players
Louisville Colonels players
Bridgeport Giants players
Newburyport Clamdiggers players
Boston Blues players
Salem Fairies players
Worcester Grays players
Wilkes-Barre Barons (baseball) players
Lincoln Rustlers players
Des Moines Prohibitionists players
Omaha Lambs players
New Haven Nutmegs players
Rochester Flour Cities players
Lowell Lowells players
Fall River Indians players
New Haven Blues players
Lewiston (minor league baseball) players